Justice Tellipalai Wanarajah Rajaratnam (21 December 1920 – 15 January 1994) was a leading Sri Lankan Tamil lawyer, judge and politician. He was a Commissioner of Assize, Supreme Court judge and Member of Parliament.

Early life
Rajaratnam was born on 21 December 1920. He was the son of T. C. Rajaratnam, a proctor for Jaffna. He was educated at Trinity College, Kandy. After school he entered university and graduated with an honours degree in western classics and law.

Career
Rajaratnam admitted to the bar in 1948. He was admitted to Lincoln's Inn in 1951. He practised law in the UK before returning to Ceylon where he continued to practice law. He worked on the Sathasivam and Bibile MP murder cases. He then joined the judicial service, becoming a Commissioner of Assize in 1970. He was appointed a Supreme Court judge in 1972, a position he held for six years.

Later life
In retirement Rajaratnam wrote two books: A Manual of Industrial Law and Plantation Workers' Manual. He is also published The Bhutto Trial for which he received the Hilal-e-Quaid-i-Azam honour from Pakistan. In 1989 he was appointed to Parliament as a National List MP for the Sri Lanka Freedom Party.

Rajaratnam died on 15 January 1994 at the age of 73.

References

1920 births
1994 deaths
Alumni of Trinity College, Kandy
Members of the 9th Parliament of Sri Lanka
People from Jaffna
Sri Lanka Freedom Party politicians
Sri Lankan Tamil judges
Sri Lankan Tamil lawyers
Sri Lankan Tamil politicians
Sri Lankan Tamil writers
Puisne Justices of the Supreme Court of Sri Lanka
Sri Lankan expatriates in the United Kingdom